The yellow-browed tyrant (Satrapa icterophrys) is a species of bird in the family Tyrannidae. It is monotypic within the genus Satrapa.
It is found in Argentina, Bolivia, Brazil, Colombia, Paraguay, Peru, Uruguay, and Venezuela, where its natural habitats are subtropical or tropical moist lowland forests, pastureland, and heavily degraded former forest.

References

yellow-browed tyrant
Birds of Argentina
Birds of Venezuela
Birds of Brazil
Birds of Bolivia
Birds of Paraguay
Birds of Uruguay
yellow-browed tyrant
Taxa named by Louis Jean Pierre Vieillot
Taxonomy articles created by Polbot